Wolfgang Hoffmann (1900–1969) was an Austrian-American architect and designer active in the American modernism movement between 1926 and 1942. His reputation was overshadowed by that of his father, the architect and designer Josef Hoffmann, and ex-wife,  Josefine Pola Weinbach Hoffmann, better known as Pola Stout.

Early life and education 
Hoffmann was born in Klosterneuburg, near Vienna, Austria in 1900, the son of the architect, pedagogue and Wiener Werkstatte co-founder Joseph Hoffmann (1870–1956). Following eight years at the Realschule, he spent another three years at a special architectural school. Graduating from the Kunstgewerbeschule (University of Applied Arts, Vienna), where he studied under Oskar Strnad and Josef Frank, he spent a year-and-a-half gaining practical experience in an architect's office before joining his father's firm for two years.

Marriage and emigration to U.S. 
In 1925 the architect Joseph Urban, working in New York, wrote to Josef Hoffmann asking him to recommend an assistant. Hoffmann recommended his son Wolfgang, and Urban sent him a first-class passage ticket to join him in the US.

While studying at the Kunstgewerbeschule Wolfgang met his father's student Pola Weinbach, who had come from Stryi to study in Vienna. Following Urban's invitation to America, Wolfgang and Pola were married in Vienna.  Wolfgang converted his first class ticket to two steerage tickets, and the two set sail. The couple arrived in New York in December 1925.

New York 
Hoffman worked for Urban for nine months, and then set up his own design firm with an office on Madison Avenue in Manhattan. Throughout the late 1920s and early 1930s the Hoffmans created "contemporary interiors and industrial designs" for stores, theaters and private residences.  Their custom furniture appeared in the February 1929 issue of House & Garden (magazine) credited to Urban and "Pola Hoffmann, Inc.", although  Pola was the textile designer of the team.

American Designers' Gallery 
The American Designers' Gallery, established in the fall of 1928, included the Hoffmans and Urban, ceramist Henry Varnum Poor (designer) (1888–1971), architect Raymond Hood (1881–1934), artist designer Winold Reiss (1886–1953), graphic designer Lucien Bernhard (1896–1981), decorator Donald Deskey (1894–1989), and architect Ely Jacques Kahn (1884–1972). It was "...devoted exclusively to showing objects and interiors for practical use... by fourteen American architects and designers." The Hoffmanns' works were featured in the expositions of the Gallery in 1928 and 1929. The 1929 exhibition featured  Wolfgang's bench, dinette table and two chairs in American walnut, and Pola's rug. They also collaborated with Lucian Bernhard's Contempora gallery and decorating service.

"The 1929 exhibition catalog promised  a coherent vision of modern design... from forms developed in [Europe]... characterized by affordability, simplicity and practicality, as well as appropriateness for use in traditional interiors as well as modern ones." (Marilyn F. Friedman: Defining Modernism at the American Designers' Gallery, New York) 

In 1931, Wolfgang's work was exhibited at New York's Museum of Modern Art, and the same year he and Kem Weber (1889–1963) organized an exhibition of "Modern Industrial and Decorative Arts" at the Brooklyn Museum which showed both Hoffmanns' works.

The Hoffmanns divorced in 1932, also dissolving their business partnership. Pola then married writer Rex Stout and moved to Danbury, Connecticut.

Chicago World's Fair 
In 1932 Hoffmann was asked to assist Urban in developing the "Rainbow City" color scheme for the 1933–1934 Chicago World's Fair, subtitled A Century of Progress 1833–1933.

He also designed the interiors and furniture for the fair's Lumber Industries house which included suites for a living room, dining room, master bedroom and  guest room. The exhibition's eight-page booklet "The Sunlight House Interiors Designed by Wolfgang Hoffman; Century of Progress 1933" described and pictured innovative features such as an expanding dinner table, combination desk-bookcase, and chairs designed to comfortably accommodate different body types, as well as a list of the manufacturers involved.

In 1934, Donald Deskey asked Hoffmann to design birchwood furniture for Helena Rubinstein's Park Avenue apartment.

"Chromsteel"

Hoffmann moved to Illinois when the W. H. Howell Company of Geneva, Illinois (later of St. Charles, also in the Tri-City)  hired him in 1934. Between 1934 and 1942 he created a large number of furniture designs in "Chromsteel".  Howell's 1938 sales catalogue featured a photo of Hoffmann, captioned:

"Mr. Wolfgang Hoffmann, internationally recognized as an authority in the development of authentic modern furniture... designs for Howell exclusively."

Hoffman's designs featured tubular or flat chromium-plated steel, which he incorporated into chairs, desks and tables to provide a "fluid and graceful appearance."

Hoffmann left the company in 1942 when it converted to war production.

Photographer
Hoffmann and his wife Ann, living in the Tri-City community of Batavia, opened an up-to-date photography studio in the Unity Building, Geneva, on October 1, 1944. The business continued there and in two other locations for nearly 25 years.

"Mr. Hoffmann was both a commercial and industrial photographer and was staff photographer for Community Hospital for many years...  He took photographs of many Geneva individuals and families and also of many local weddings."  (February 20, 1969 front page of The Geneva Republican)

Death
Though ailing for several months, Hoffman continued working almost up until his death in Community Hospital on February 16, 1969. A requiem mass was said for him at St. Peter's Catholic Church on February 24.

He was survived by his wife, Ann, and daughter, Pamela.

References

1900 births
1969 deaths
20th-century American architects
Austrian emigrants to the United States